Obaseki is a Nigerian surname. Notable people with this surname include:

 Agho Obaseki (died 1920), Benin leader
 Andrews Otutu Obaseki (1926–2017), Nigerian jurist
 Darlington Obaseki (born 1968), Nigerian professor
 Gaius Obaseki, Nigerian politician
 Godwin Obaseki (born 1957), Nigerian politician
 Matilda Obaseki, Nigerian actress